"Italia" is a song by French rapper Jul released in 2020. It peaked at number two in France.

Charts

Certifications

References 

2020 singles
2020 songs
French-language songs